William Linder (born 1886) was an American Negro league pitcher in the 1920s.

A native of Tennessee, Linder played for the Kansas City Monarchs in 1922. In three recorded games, he posted a 5.06 ERA over 10.2 innings.

References

External links
 and Seamheads

1886 births
Date of birth missing
Year of death missing
Place of birth missing
Place of death missing
Kansas City Monarchs players